is a Ryukyuan gusuku in Uruma, Okinawa. In 2000, Katsuren Castle was designated as a World Heritage Site, as a part of the Gusuku Sites and Related Properties of the Kingdom of Ryukyu.

History
With the Pacific Ocean on two sides, it is also called the "Ocean Gusuku". Its "golden age" was in the mid-15th century, under the powerful Aji of Katsuren, Amawari. The castle was destroyed in 1458 by the Ryukyuan army. Precious tile and Chinese porcelain of the era have been excavated from Katsuren. Such remains testify to the magnificence of the ancient structure and the robust entrepôt trade between Japan, Korea, China, and Southeast Asia. The castle also has an active shrine of the Ryukyuan religion within the first bailey dedicated to Kobazukasa. In the 2010 Okinawa earthquake an outer wall at the northeast of the third bailey of Katsuren Castle was damaged.

Katsuren Castle was designated a UNESCO World Heritage Site in 2000 as part of one of the nine Gusuku Sites and Related Properties of the Kingdom of Ryukyu.

In 2016, both ancient Roman currency and medieval Ottoman currency were excavated there. This was the first time that Roman coins were excavated in Japan.

Transportation
Katsuren Castle can be reached from the Naha Bus Terminal at Naha Airport via the Number 52 bus route, a ride of 1 hour and 20 minutes from the bus terminal. The castle is a five-minute walk from the  stop. The castle site can also be reached by the Okinawa Expressway via the Okinawa Minami IC.

References

External links

Katsuren Castle Ruins, Uruma City Official Website
Japan-Guide.com
The Amawari-Gosamaru dramatic episode that led to the waning of the power of Katsuren gusuku.

Castles in Okinawa Prefecture
Former castles in Japan
Historic Sites of Japan
Ruined castles in Japan
World Heritage Sites in Japan